George Tagaris was a Byzantine general of the middle 14th century, who rose to the rank of megas stratopedarches.

Life 
The Tagaris family is first attested in the early years of the 14th century. George's father Manuel Tagaris was the first of the family to rise to prominence: despite his family's low social status, his valour and ability as a general were recognized by Emperor Andronikos II Palaiologos, who promoted him to the rank of megas stratopedarches and gave him his niece, Theodora Palaiologina Asanina, a daughter of Tsar Ivan Asen III of Bulgaria, as his second wife. It is unclear if Theodora or Manuel's first wife, a Monomachina Doukaina, was George's mother. George may in turn have been a brother or father—or somehow otherwise related—to the future Latin Patriarch of Constantinople Paul Palaiologos Tagaris.

George Tagaris first appears in 1346, during the Byzantine civil war of 1341–47. At the time he already held the rank of megas stratopedarches, like his father before him, and was entrusted by Empress-regent Anna of Savoy with a mission to the Turkish ruler Saruhan Bey, to enlist his support in the war, especially after the Empress' opponent, John Kantakouzenos, had successfully concluded an alliance with Orhan, ruler of the rising Ottoman beylik. Saruhan, who had known George's father from the latter's tenure as governor of Philadelphia, gladly complied with the request. George is next mentioned in 1356, when he was among the recipients of letters from Pope Innocent VI, who praised him for his support of a union between the Roman Catholic and the Eastern Orthodox churches.

References

Sources 
 
 
 

14th-century deaths
Year of birth unknown
Year of death unknown
14th-century Byzantine military personnel
Byzantine generals
Megaloi stratopedarchai
Tagaris family